La Brea Tar Pits is an active paleontological research site in urban Los Angeles. Hancock Park was formed around a group of tar pits where natural asphalt (also called asphaltum, bitumen, or pitch; brea in Spanish) has seeped up from the ground for tens of thousands of years. Over many centuries, the bones of trapped animals have been preserved. The George C. Page Museum is dedicated to researching the tar pits and displaying specimens from the animals that died there. La Brea Tar Pits is a registered National Natural Landmark.

Formation

Tar pits are composed of heavy oil fractions called gilsonite, which seeps from the Earth as oil. Crude oil seeps up along the 6th Street Fault from the Salt Lake Oil Field, which underlies much of the Fairfax District north of Hancock Park.  The oil reaches the surface and forms pools, becoming asphalt as the lighter fractions of the petroleum biodegrade or evaporate. The asphalt then normally hardens into stubby mounds. The pools and mounds can be seen in several areas of the park.

This seepage has been happening for tens of thousands of years, during which the asphalt sometimes formed a deposit thick enough to trap animals. The deposit would become covered over with water, dust, or leaves. Animals would wander in, become trapped, and die. Predators would enter to eat the trapped animals and would also become stuck. As the bones of a dead animal sink, the asphalt soaks into them, turning them dark-brown or black in color. Lighter fractions of petroleum evaporate from the asphalt, leaving a more solid substance, which then encases the bones. Dramatic fossils of large mammals have been extricated but the asphalt also preserves microfossils: wood and plant remnants, rodent bones, insects, mollusks, dust, seeds, leaves, and pollen grains. Examples of some of these are on display in the George C. Page Museum. Radiometric dating of preserved wood and bones has given an age of 38,000 years for the oldest known material from the La Brea seeps.

History

The Native American Chumash and Tongva people living in the area built boats unlike any others in North America. Pulling fallen Northern California redwood trunks and pieces of driftwood from the Santa Barbara Channel, their ancestors learned to seal the cracks between the boards of the large wooden plank canoes by using the natural resource of tar. This innovative form of transportation allowed access up and down the coastline and to the Channel Islands. The Portolá expedition, a group of Spanish explorers led by Gaspar de Portolá, made the first written record of the tar pits in 1769. Father Juan Crespí wrote,
While crossing the basin, the scouts reported having seen some geysers of tar issuing from the ground like springs; it boils up molten, and the water runs to one side and the tar to the other. The scouts reported that they had come across many of these springs and had seen large swamps of them, enough, they said, to caulk many vessels. We were not so lucky ourselves as to see these tar geysers, much though we wished it; as it was some distance out of the way we were to take, the Governor [Portolá] did not want us to go past them. We christened them Los Volcanes de Brea [the Tar Volcanoes].

Harrison Rogers, who accompanied Jedediah Smith on his 1826 expedition to California, was shown a piece of the solidified asphalt while at Mission San Gabriel, and noted in his journal, "The Citizens of the Country make great use of it to pitch the roofs of their houses".

The La Brea Tar Pits and Hancock Park are situated within what was once the Mexican land grant of Rancho La Brea. For some years, tar-covered bones were found on the Rancho La Brea property, but were not initially recognized as fossils because the ranch had lost various animals–including horses, cattle, dogs, and even camels–whose bones closely resemble several of the fossil species. The original Rancho La Brea land grant stipulated that the tar pits be open to the public for the use of the local Pueblo. Initially, they mistook the bones in the pits for the remains of pronghorn (Antilocapra americana) or cattle that had become mired.

In 1886, the first excavation for land pitch in the village of La Brea was undertaken by Messrs Turnbull, Stewart & co..

Union Oil geologist W. W. Orcutt is credited, in 1901, with first recognizing that fossilized prehistoric animal bones were preserved in pools of asphalt on the Hancock Ranch. In commemoration of Orcutt's initial discovery, paleontologists named the La Brea coyote (Canis latrans orcutti) in his honor.

John C. Merriam of the University of California led much of the original work in this area early in the 1900s.

Contemporary excavations of the bones started in 1913–1915.  In the 1940s and 1950s, public excitement was generated by the preparation of previously recovered large mammal bones. A subsequent study demonstrated the fossil vertebrate material was well preserved, with little evidence of bacterial degradation of bone protein. They are believed to be some 10–20,000 years old, dating from the last glacial period.

Excavation of "Project 23" and newly uncovered pits

On February 18, 2009, George C. Page Museum announced the 2006 discovery of 16 fossil deposits that had been removed from the ground during the construction of an underground parking garage for the Los Angeles County Museum of Art next to the tar pits. Among the finds are remains of a saber-toothed cat, dire wolves, bison, horses, a giant ground sloth, turtles, snails, clams, millipedes, fish, gophers, and an American lion. Also discovered is a nearly intact mammoth skeleton, nicknamed Zed; the only pieces missing are a rear leg, a vertebra, and the top of its skull, which was sheared off by construction equipment in preparation to build the parking structure.

These fossils were packaged in boxes at the construction site and moved to a compound behind Pit 91, on Page Museum property, so that construction could continue. Twenty-three large accumulations of tar and specimens were taken to the Page Museum. These deposits are worked on under the name "Project 23". As work for the public transit D Line is extended, museum researchers know more tar pits will be uncovered, for example near the intersection of Wilshire and Curson.

George C. Page Museum 

In 1913, George Allan Hancock, the owner of Rancho La Brea, granted the Natural History Museum of Los Angeles County exclusive excavation rights at the Tar Pits for two years. In those two years, the museum was able to extract 750,000 specimens at 96 sites, guaranteeing that a large collection of fossils would remain consolidated and available to the community. Then in 1924, Hancock donated  to LA County with the stipulation that the county provide for the preservation of the park and the exhibition of fossils found there. 

The George C. Page Museum of La Brea Discoveries, part of the Natural History Museum of Los Angeles County, was built next to the tar pits in Hancock Park on Wilshire Boulevard. Construction began in 1975, and the museum opened to the public in 1977. The area is part of urban Los Angeles in the Miracle Mile District.

The museum tells the story of the tar pits and presents specimens excavated from them. Visitors can walk around the park and see the tar pits.  On the grounds of the park are life-sized models of prehistoric animals in or near the tar pits.  Of more than 100 pits, only Pit 91 is still regularly excavated by researchers and can be seen at the Pit 91 viewing station. In addition to Pit 91, the one other ongoing excavation is called "Project 23". Paleontologists supervise and direct the work of volunteers at both sites.

IUGS geological heritage site
In respect of it being the 'richest paleontological site on Earth for terrestrial fossils of late Quaternary age', the International Union of Geological Sciences (IUGS) included the 'Late Quaternary asphalt seeps and paleontological site of La Brea Tar Pits' in its assemblage of 100 'geological heritage sites' around the world in a listing published in October 2022. The organisation defines an IUGS Geological Heritage Site as 'a key place with geological elements and/or processes of international scientific relevance, used as a reference, and/or with a substantial contribution to the development of geological sciences through history.'

Flora and fauna

Among the prehistoric species associated with the La Brea Tar Pits are Pleistocene mammoths, dire wolves, short-faced bears, American lions, ground sloths (including Jefferson's ground sloth), coyotes, ancient bison, and the state fossil of California, the saber-toothed cat (Smilodon fatalis).

The park is known for producing myriad mammal fossils dating from the last glacial period.  While mammal fossils generate significant interest, other fossils, including fossilized insects and plants, and even pollen grains, are also valued. These fossils help define a picture of what is thought to have been a cooler, moister climate in the Los Angeles basin during the glacial age. Microfossils are retrieved from the matrix of asphalt and sandy clay by washing with a solvent to remove the petroleum, then picking through the remains under a high-powered lens.

Historically, the majority of the mammals excavated from the La Brea deposits had been large carnivores, supporting a hypothesized "carnivore trap" in which large herbivores entrapped in asphalt attracted predators and scavengers which then became entrapped while trying to steal a quick meal. However, new research with an eye towards microfossils has revealed a stunning diversity and abundance of many types of mammals. According to palentologist Thomas Halliday, "Rancho La Brea Tar Pits... where big herbivores typically get stuck in tar which naturally seeps from the ground, and as a result, you get huge concentrations of just specifically herbivores. You get a herbivorous sample of the ecosystem and very few carnivores, except those that are trying to scavenge on the already dead carcasses that have just got stuck in the tar."

Bacteria
Methane gas escapes from the tar pits, causing bubbles that make the asphalt appear to boil. Asphalt and methane appear under surrounding buildings and require special operations for removal to prevent the weakening of building foundations. In 2007, researchers from UC Riverside discovered that the bubbles were caused by hardy forms of bacteria embedded in the natural asphalt. After consuming petroleum, the bacteria release methane. Around 200 to 300 species of bacteria were newly discovered here.

Human presence
Only one human has been found, a partial skeleton of the La Brea Woman dated to around 10,000 calendar years (about 9,000 radiocarbon years) BP, who was 17 to 25 years old at death and found associated with remains of a domestic dog,  so was interpreted to have been ceremonially interred. In 2016, however, the dog was determined to be much younger in date.

Also, some even older fossils showed possible tool marks, indicating humans active in the area at the time. Bones of saber-toothed cats from La Brea showing signs of "artificial" cut marks at oblique angles to the long axis of each bone were radiocarbon dated to 15,200 ± 800 B.P. (uncalibrated).

If these cuts are in fact tool marks resultant from butchering activities, then this material would provide the earliest solid evidence for human association with the Los Angeles Basin. Yet it is also possible that there was some residual contamination of the material as a result of saturation by asphaltum, influencing the radiocarbon dates.

Gallery

See also

 Binagadi asphalt lake
 Carpinteria Tar Pits
 Lagerstätten
 Lake Bermudez
 List of fossil sites
 Los Angeles County Museum of Art
 McKittrick Tar Pits
 Pitch Lake

References

External links

 Page Museum – La Brea Tar Pits
 UCMP Berkeley website: describes the geology and paleontology of the asphalt seeps.
 Gocalifornia.com: La Brea Tar Pits – visitor guide.
 Palaeo.uk: "Setting the La Brea site in context."
 NHM.org: Pit 91 excavations

 
Asphalt lakes
Fossil parks in the United States
Parks in Los Angeles
Museums in Los Angeles
Natural history museums in California
Natural history of Los Angeles County, California
Paleontology in California
Pleistocene paleontological sites of North America
California Historical Landmarks
Landmarks in Los Angeles
National Natural Landmarks in California
Lagerstätten
Petroleum in California
Pleistocene California
Articles containing video clips
1901 in paleontology
1964 in paleontology
20th century in Los Angeles
Environment of Greater Los Angeles
Mid-Wilshire, Los Angeles
Wilshire Boulevard
First 100 IUGS Geological Heritage Sites